Washington Island Airport  is a town owned public use airport located on Washington Island, in the Town of Washington, Door County, Wisconsin, United States. It is included in the Federal Aviation Administration (FAA) National Plan of Integrated Airport Systems for 2021–2025, in which it is categorized as a basic general aviation facility.

Facilities and aircraft 
Washington Island Airport covers an area of 113 acres (46 ha) at an elevation of 652 feet (199 m) above mean sea level. It has two runways with turf surfaces: 2/20 is 2,250 by 150 feet (686 x 46 m) and 14/32 is 2,232 by 150 feet (680 x 46 m).

For the 12-month period ending August 17, 2022, the airport had 6,030 aircraft operations, an average of 17 per day: 99% general aviation and less than 1% military. In January 2023, there were 4 aircraft based at this airport: all 4 single-engine.

Climate

See also 
 List of airports in Wisconsin

References

External links 
  at Wisconsin DOT Airport Directory

 The Country Doctor Takes by Betty L. McKelvey, Flying Magazine, October 1939, page 30; article includes photos taken at the airport

Airports in Wisconsin
Buildings and structures in Door County, Wisconsin
Transportation in Door County, Wisconsin